Live Sessions is an extended play by Bonobo. Four Bonobo classics ("Noctuary", "Dismantling Frank", "The Plug", and "Nothing Owed") have been taken out of the laptop/sampler and reconstructed with live bass, drums, saxophone, keys, cello, guitars and electronics. "Recurring" is a brand new studio track recorded on the fly in this session. The extended play is rounded out by Four Tet's remix of "Pick Up".

Track listing

Personnel
All songs written by Simon Green.

 Simon Green – bass
 Simon Janes – cello, guitar
 Jack Baker – drums
 James De Malplaquet – effects (electronics), percussion, vocals
 Simon Little – keyboards
 Ben Cooke – saxophone
 Ryan Morey – mastering
 Stephen Hodge – mixing, engineer
 Suzi Green – project manager

Sources
 Press Release from the official Bonobo website.

References

2005 EPs
Bonobo (musician) EPs
Live EPs
2005 live albums
Ninja Tune live albums
Ninja Tune EPs